Ocellated skink may refer to:
 Chalcides ocellatus , found around the Mediterranean 
 Chalcides bottegi, found in Ethiopia, Kenya, and Sudan
 Niveoscincus ocellatus, the Tasmanian ocellated or spotted skink

Animal common name disambiguation pages